The General Staff of the Swiss Armed Forces  ( was the managing military staff of Switzerland. It was led by a Chief of the General Staff who held the rank of Korpskommandant (NATO: OF-8). He/she was effectively the highest-ranking officer in the Swiss military. Until 1830, the general staff consisted of 12 to 24 federal colonels and a few lieutenant colonels with experience in serving foreign armies. In 1865, the Federal Staff Office was created, with its responsibility being to maintain the Swiss combat readiness for war. In 1948, most of the services of the Federal Military Department were grouped together in the General Staff. After the Second World War, General Staff training was increasingly a precondition for the assumption of an army unit command. It operated until the end of 2003, when the reforms of Armee XXI introduced the position of Chief of the Armed Forces. Until its reorganization, the General Staff was the highest level of command in the Swiss Armed forces, with the Chief of the General Staff acting as the primus inter pares (first among equals). Even after the reform of the army, the military continued to utilize, General Staff officers, who are trained in the General Staff School to become senior management assistants in the armed forces.

List of Chiefs of the General Staff 
The following is a list of chiefs of the General Staff from 1870 to 2003:

References 

Military of Switzerland
Staff (military)
Military history of Switzerland